Steigkoppe is a wooded hill in the Spessart range of Bavaria, Germany.

More specifically, Steigkoppe is in the unincorporated area Sailaufer Forst between Laufach and Jakobsthal, part of Heigenbrücken.

The Eselsweg long-distance hiking path passes over the hill. There is also a district road (AB2) from Sailauf to Wiesen. South of the peak rises the Beibuschbach. To the west lies the source of the Sailaufbach.

References

Hills of Bavaria
Aschaffenburg (district)
Hills of the Spessart